Our Lady of Grace Church is a historic Black Catholic church near the junction of Airline Highway and 3rd Street in Reserve, Louisiana.  It was built in 1937 and added to the National Register of Historic Places in 2005.

It was deemed "significant in the areas of religion, social history and ethnic heritage because it represents an important historical phenomenon in the history of the Catholic Church in southern Louisiana - the formation of separate churches for African-American parishioners."

It is staffed by priests from the Josephites and was listed on the Louisiana African American Heritage Trail in 2012.

References

Roman Catholic churches in Louisiana
Churches on the National Register of Historic Places in Louisiana
Roman Catholic churches completed in 1937
Churches in St. John the Baptist Parish, Louisiana
National Register of Historic Places in St. John the Baptist Parish, Louisiana
20th-century Roman Catholic church buildings in the United States
African-American Roman Catholic churches

Josephite churches in the United States
Louisiana African American Heritage Trail